Bunjil is a small town in Western Australia located on the Mullewa Wubin Road  north of Perth in the Mid West region. At the 2021 census, it had a population of 61.

The townsite was gazetted in 1914, after being initially established as a railway siding in 1913 to allow transport of crops and stock. The name is Indigenous Australian in origin but its meaning is unknown.

In 1932 the Wheat Pool of Western Australia announced that the town would have two grain elevators, each fitted with an engine, installed at the railway siding.

The main industry in town is wheat farming with the town being a Cooperative Bulk Handling receival site.

References 

Shire of Perenjori
Grain receival points of Western Australia